Zdroj (Source) is a 2005 Czech documentary directed by Martin Mareček and written by Martin Mareček and Martin Skalský.  The film explores the civil rights abuses by the Ilham Aliyev regime of Azerbaijan during the construction of the Baku-Tbilisi-Ceyhan pipeline, such as eminent domain violations in appropriating land for the pipeline's route, and criticism of the government leading to arrest.

External links
Official website of Zdroj

 
Variety review of Zdroj
Strictly Film School review

2005 films
2000s Czech-language films
Azerbaijani-language films
Czech documentary films
Documentary films about human rights
2005 documentary films
2005 multilingual films
Czech multilingual films
2000s Czech films